The 1991 Big Ten Conference baseball tournament was held at Trautman Field on the campus of Ohio State University in Columbus, Ohio, from May 15 through 19. The top four teams from the regular season participated in the double-elimination tournament, the eleventh annual tournament sponsored by the Big Ten Conference to determine the league champion.  won their first tournament championship and earned the Big Ten Conference's automatic bid to the 1991 NCAA Division I baseball tournament

Format and seeding 
The 1991 tournament was a 4-team double-elimination tournament, with seeds determined by conference regular season winning percentage only. Indiana claimed the third seed and Northwestern earned the fourth seed by tiebreakers over Michigan.

Tournament

All-Tournament Team 
The following players were named to the All-Tournament Team.

Most Outstanding Player 
Keith Klodnick was named Most Outstanding Player. Klodnick was an outfielder for Ohio State.

References 

Tournament
Big Ten baseball tournament
Big Ten Baseball Tournament
Big Ten baseball tournament